High Harrington railway station was opened by the Cleator and Workington Junction Railway (C&WJR) in 1879. It was situated half a mile south of Harrington Junction on the company's main line. and served what was then the eastern extremity of Harrington in Cumbria, England. The station is not to be confused with the current  station a kilometre away on the coastal line.

History
The line was one of the fruits of the rapid industrialisation of West Cumberland in the second half of the nineteenth century, specifically being born as a reaction to oligopolistic behaviour by the London and North Western and Whitehaven, Cleator and Egremont Railways. Both line and station opened to passengers on 1 October 1879.

All lines in the area were primarily aimed at mineral traffic, notably iron ore, coal and limestone, none more so than the new line to Workington, which earned the local name "The Track of the Ironmasters". General goods and passenger services were provided, but were very small beer compared with mineral traffic.

The founding Act of Parliament of June 1878 confirmed the company's agreement with the Furness Railway that the latter would operate the line for one third of the receipts.

Services
Passenger trains consisted of antiquated Furness stock hauled largely by elderly Furness engines referred to as "rolling ruins" by one author after a footplate ride in 1949.

No Sunday passenger service was ever provided on the line.

The initial passenger service in 1879 consisted of
they returned as Down trains, leaving Workington at 10:30 and 16:00

The service was extended to run to and from Siddick and an extra train was added, with
 three up trains a day, leaving Moor Row at 07:40, 10:12 and 14:45, taking 30 minutes to Workington and an extra four to proceed to Siddick, where connections were made with the MCR.
 Down trains left Siddick at 08:45, 12:22 and 17:00

By 1922 the service reached its high water mark, with:
 five up trains a day from Moor Row through to Siddick, leaving Moor Row at 07:20, 09:50, 13:15, 16:50 and 1820.
 one Saturdays Only train leaving Cleator Moor (NB not from Moor Row) at 12:50 for Workington
 one Saturdays Only train leaving Moor Row at 19:35 for Workington

Two Saturdays Only trains left  at 16:05 and 21:35 for Workington, calling at Distington and High Harrington, with balancing workings leaving Workington at 15:30 and 21:00.

As with advertised passenger trains, in 1920 workmen's trains ran on the company's three southern routes:
 between Workington Central and Lowca using the Lowca Light Railway
 on the "main line" between Siddick Junction and Moor Row
 from Siddick Junction to Moor Row, calling at all passenger stations except Moresby Parks, calling at  instead 
The situation in 1922 was similar.

The 1920 Working Time Table shows relatively few Goods trains, with just one a day in each direction booked to call at High Harrington.

Mineral traffic was an altogether different matter, dwarfing all other traffic in volume, receipts and profits. The key source summarises it "...the 'Track of the Ironmasters' ran like a main traffic artery through an area honeycombed with mines, quarries and ironworks." The associated drama was all the greater because all the company's lines abounded with steep inclines and sharp curves, frequently requiring banking. The saving grace was that south of Workington at least, most gradients favoured loaded trains. During the First World War especially, the company ran "Double Trains", akin to North American practice, with two mineral trains coupled together and a banking engine behind, i.e. locomotive-wagons-guards van-locomotive-wagons-guards van-banker. The practice was discontinued after dark from 1 April 1918.

Most stations on the company's lines had heavy industrial neighbours, such as ironworks next to Cleator Moor West, or served primarily industrial workforces, such as Keekle Colliers' Platform. Throughout its working life High Harrington was more isolated, with heavy industry visible but not next to the station. By 2013 the station site was flanked substantial housing estates.

Like any business tied to one or few industries, the railway was at the mercy of trade fluctuations and technological change. The Cumberland iron industry led the charge in the nineteenth century, but became less and less competitive as time passed and local ore became worked out and harder to win, taking the fortunes of the railway with it. The peak year was 1909, when 1,644,514 tons of freight were handled. Ominously for the line, that tonnage was down to just over 800,000 by 1922, bringing receipts of £83,349, compared with passenger fares totalling £6,570.

Rundown and closure
The high water mark for tonnage was 1909, the high water mark for progress was 1913, with the opening of the Harrington and Lowca line for passenger traffic. A chronology of the line's affairs from 1876 to 1992 has almost no entries before 1914 which fail to include "opened" or "commenced". After 1918 the position was reversed, when the litany of step-by-step closures and withdrawals was relieved only by a control cabin and a signalbox being erected in 1919 and the Admiralty saving the northern extension in 1937 by establishing an armaments depot at Broughton.

High Harrington station closed on 13 April 1931 when normal passenger traffic ended along the line.

An enthusiasts' special ran through on 6 September 1954, the only one to do so using main line passenger stock. The next such train to traverse any C&WJR metals did so in 1966 at the north end of the line, three years after the line through High Harrington closed.

Afterlife
By 2013 aerial images clearly show the line of route and that the area around the station site had been transformed by housing. The trackbed through the station site was used by the West Cumbria Cycle Network.

See also

 Maryport and Carlisle Railway
 Furness Railway
 Whitehaven, Cleator and Egremont Railway
 Cockermouth and Workington Railway

References

Sources

Further reading

External links
Map of the CWJR with photos RAILSCOT
Map of the WC&ER with photos RAILSCOT
The station Rail Map Online
The station on overlain OS maps surveyed from 1898 National Library of Scotland
The closed station on a 1948 OS Map npe maps
The station and line railwaycodes
The railways of Cumbria Cumbrian Railways Association
Photos of Cumbrian railways Cumbrian Railways Association
The railways of Cumbria Railways_of_Cumbria
Cumbrian Industrial History Cumbria Industrial History Society
Furness Railtour using many West Cumberland lines 5 September 1954 sixbellsjunction
A video tour-de-force of the region's closed lines cumbriafilmarchive
1882 RCH Diagram showing the station, see page 173 of the pdf google
Haematite earthminerals
Coal and iron ore mining in Cleator Moor Haig Pit
Photos of the station, line, staff, tickets and timetables Harrington History

Disused railway stations in Cumbria
Railway stations in Great Britain opened in 1879
Railway stations in Great Britain closed in 1931
Former Cleator and Workington Junction Railway stations